The 2021 Devon County Council election took place alongside the other local elections. All 60 councillors to Devon County Council were elected. A total of 256,974 votes were cast including spoiled ballots.

Summary

Election result

|-

Division Results

East Devon

Exeter

Mid Devon

North Devon

South Hams

Teignbridge

Torridge

West Devon

Aftermath

References 

Devon County Council elections
2020s in Devon
2021 English local elections